Frederick Converse Beach (March 27, 1848 – June 8, 1918), son of Alfred Ely Beach, was editor of the magazine Scientific American and of the new Encyclopedia Americana in the early 1900s, and an inventor of a photolithographic process.

Biography

Frederick Converse Beach was born on March 27, 1848, in Brooklyn, New York to Alfred Ely Beach. He graduated from Yale's Sheffield Scientific School in 1868. In 1869, he was made night superintendent of the Beach Pneumatic Transit tunnel under Broadway, and then in 1870, operated a pneumatic car and explained its working to the public.

From 1871 to 1876, he was engaged in the manufacture of electrical instruments in New York, making telegraphs. He later became Editor for Scientific American, their family magazine, and became one of the co owners, as well as co owner of Munn & Company, a patent agency, and of American Photography magazine.

After working on improving the telephone technology, he became the first, in 1880, to transmit sermons over the telephone, communicating from Plymouth Church (Brooklyn), to his father's house at 31 Union Place, in front of Union Square, New York. In 1884, he founded the Society of Amateur Photographers of New York, becoming its first President, and joined the Postal Progress League and became also its President.

He secured a parcel post for the United States, brought many reforms, and looked forward to the time when aerial transport of all kinds of mail will happen by the atmosphere. He was made a member of the New York Electrical Society, New York Camera Club, American Institute of New York, and was made President of the Housatonic Yacht Club, the oldest operating Yacht club in Connecticut.

In 1889 he was the editor of American Photography, and in 1896 he became a director of the Scientific American. From 1902 he was editor in chief of the Encyclopedia Americana, which was the first major multivolume encyclopedia published in the United States.

Frederick also funded, in thousands of dollars, the airplane designs of his son Stanley from 1903–1910.

He died on June 8, 1918, at his home in Stratford, Connecticut.

Family legacy

Frederick was the father of Alfred Gilbert, Ethel Holbrook, who married to caricaturist James Albert Wales, and Stanley Yale Beach.

Stanley Yale Beach (1877-1955), was an aviation pioneer, who was an early financier of Gustave Whitehead, the contested first maker of a powered controlled flight before the Wright brothers.

He attended Yale's Sheffield Scientific School like his father, and afterward developed a lifetime interest in aeronautics, engineering, and inventing. He began designing airplane engines on his own in 1903, and designed a biplane with Gustave Whitehead. Stanley became half-assignor of Whitehead's aeroplane patent and signed it as a witness. The body of the framework was referred by Scientific American as a bat-like aeroplane and a bat machine, on which Whitehead made a number of short flights in 1901. 

This was before the first flight achieved by the Wright brothers in 1903. In 2013, Connecticut Governor Dan Malloy signed into law House Bill 6671 recognizing Gustave Whitehead as the first person to achieve powered flight, despite the issue still being debated among historians.

Stanley worked in the Beach Building on 125 East 23rd Street, Manhattan, but also worked for Scientific American Magazine, the family business, as their aeronautic editor. The company was seated at 37 Park Row, and later at 261 Broadway, and finally at 361 Broadway. A few years before his father's death, in 1915, they moved the headquarters to the famous Woolworth Building in Manhattan at 233 Broadway, one of the first skyscrapers, and the tallest building in the world at the time. The building had been finished in 1913, just two years earlier.

Stanley then founded his own enterprises. His businesses were the Beach Engineering Company, the Beach Laboratories Company, the Scientific Aeroplane Company,  and the Beach-Basenach Airship Company of America. He also founded associations such as the Aero Science Club, and co founded the Aeronautic Society of New York.

He became a member of the Aero Club of America, along with Vincent Astor, and was the head of Scientific Aeroplane Company of Stratford, a Connecticut airplane manufacturer that proposed to build machines for fairs and other amusement enterprises. With Whitehead, they took a flight from the Harvard Aviation Field for the Harvard-Boston Aero meet of September 1910. From Lordship Park in Connecticut, their ambitions was to be the first aeroplanists to fly across Long Island Sound.

In 1910, Stanley also made an impact on the aeroplane world by inventing and patenting the first aeropane with a gyroscope attachment for stability. Around that time, with his Scientific Aeroplane Company of New York, he negotiated with the British government to sell them nine huge triplanes capable of crossing the Atlantic ocean in one flight, which was regarded with skepticism by aviation experts.

In 1915, Stanley competed with three other companies to try to win the contract for the construction of the first United States Navy airship, the project DN-1, for Franklin Delano Roosevelt, who was Assistant Secretary of the Navy at the time. The competitors were the American Dirigible Balloon Syndicate of New York, the Goodyear Tire and Rubber Company of Ohio, and the Connecticut Aircraft Company of Connecticut.

He worked with the Germans, trying to sell airships in America and secure a trans-Atlantic mail contract. Through his enterprise, he also contacted in 1930 the young film producer Howard Hughes, in an attempt to sell him an airship which would allow Hughes to travel to Europe in complete privacy and secrecy.

His personal correspondences for business interests are part of the Beinecke Rare Book & Manuscript Library at Yale University. Correspondents included Charles Nungesser and François Coli, the aviators who tried the first non-stop transatlantic flight from Paris to New York. It also included correspondence with General Billy Mitchell, the father of the United States Air Force, and Nikolaus Basenach, partner of Major general Hans Georg Friedrich Groß, the first builders of German military airships.

References 

1848 births
1918 deaths
19th-century American inventors
American magazine editors
People from Brooklyn
Journalists from New York City
Yale School of Engineering & Applied Science alumni